The Ghana Girl Guides Association (GGGA) is the National Guiding organization of Ghana. It serves 26,909 members (as of 2014). Founded in 1921 in Accra, the girls-only organization became a full member of the World Association of Girl Guides and Girl Scouts in 1960. GGGA is supported by its parent association, the World Association of Girl Guides and Girl Scouts.

Sections
 Huhuwa Guides - aged 4 - 7
 Ananse Guides - aged 7 - 10
 Girl Guides   - aged 10 - 14
 Ranger Guides - aged 14–25

Ananse (Brownies) Guides
An Ananse is a member of a Guiding organization for girls aged seven years old to nine years old.

Brownies were first organized by Lord Baden-Powell in 1914, to complete the range of age groups for girls in Scouting. They were first run as the youngest group in the Guide Association by Agnes Baden-Powell, Lord Baden-Powell’s younger sister. In 1918 his wife Lady Olave Baden-Powell took over the responsibility for the Girl Guides and thus for Brownies.

The Brownies Motto: “Always Ready to Help”.

Their Promise:

I promise that I will do my best

To do my duty to God

To serve my country, help other people

And to keep the Ananse Guide Law“

An Ananse Guide is truthful, obedient and cheerful and thinks of others before herself”

Ananse Guides are purposeful and sincere members of the Guide family.

They are busy people who love making things, playing games, helping at home, acting and singing in packs; shuttle at all levels and go out for picnics and treasure hunts.

The Group is called a Pack. They are always put into a group of six and they are called sixes. The leader in a group is called Sixer assisted by her Second.

See also
 The Ghana Scout Association

References 

World Association of Girl Guides and Girl Scouts member organizations
Scouting and Guiding in Ghana

Youth organizations established in 1921
1921 establishments in Gold Coast (British colony)